The Taiwan Contemporary Culture Lab (C-LAB) is a cultural center in Da'an District, Taipei, Taiwan. It is run by Taiwan Living Arts Foundation of the Ministry of Culture.

History
The building of the center used to be the former headquarters of the Republic of China Air Force. In April 2018, Culture Minister Cheng Li-chun announced the plan to transform the headquarters into an art and innovation space. It was then later transformed into the Taiwan Contemporary Culture Lab by Living Arts International and was opened to the public on 15 August 2018.

Transportation
The venue is accessible within walking distance west of Zhongxiao Fuxing Station of Taipei Metro.

See also
 List of tourist attractions in Taiwan

References

External links
 

2018 establishments in Taiwan
Cultural centers in Taipei
Event venues established in 2018